"Bad Company" is a song by the hard rock band Bad Company that was released on their debut album Bad Company in 1974. Co-written by the group's lead singer Paul Rodgers and drummer Simon Kirke, the song's meaning comes from a book on Victorian morals. Ultimate Classic Rock critic Matt Wardlaw described the song has having a "western vibe" and Rodgers has said that it has "an almost biblical, promise-land kind of lawless feel to it."

Reception
Ultimate Classic Rock critic Matt Wardlaw rated it as Bad Company's all-time best song, particularly praising the "legendary piano opening."  Classic Rock critic Malcolm Dome alsp rated it as Bad Company's best song, praising the "dusty atmosphere [as well as] Rodgers’ almost enigmatic vocals and [Mick] Ralphs’ haunting guitar chime."  Classic Rock History critic Janey Roberts rated it as Bad Company's 4th best song, praising the "haunting piano riff that oozed around Paul Rodgers silk vocal line" at the start of the song as well as the "powerhouse chorus."

Covers
Tori Amos performed the song at a number of concerts in 1994 and 1996.

Bill Champlin did a cover of the song that was featured in season two, episode nine of The Young Riders (1990). The title of the episode is "Bad Company".

In the beginning of The Dark Tower, Stephen King quotes the lines "I was born 6-gun in my hand, Behind a gun I'll make my final stand".

The song is also featured in season 8 of the Fox sitcom It’s Always Sunny in Philadelphia.

Garth Brooks covers the song on his box set Blame It All on My Roots: Five Decades of Influences.

The South African trio of Mark Haze, Dozi and Ghapi (from Idols South Africa VII) recorded a cover version on their album Rocking Buddies in 2013.

In Popular Culture

In the fourth part of the JoJo's Bizarre Adventure manga, Keicho Nijimura's stand, Bad Company is named after the band.

Rickie Lee Jones covered the song on her 2019 Kicks album.

Five Finger Death Punch released a cover of the song.

The song was featured in Billions, Season 5 - Episode 1, as Axe and Waggs ride motorcycles away from their spiritual retreat. Later repeated as Axe walked in to the photoshoot.

AWA tag team of Badd Company Pat Tanaka and Paul Diamond used the song as their ring entrance music.

Personnel
Paul Rodgers – vocals, piano
Mick Ralphs – lead guitar
Simon Kirke – drums
Boz Burrell – bass

Five Finger Death Punch cover

Five Finger Death Punch frequently performs a cover of this song live, and recorded the song for their second album War Is the Answer. The song has a significantly heavier tone to it, along with several lyrical edits ("I was born a shotgun in my hands", "the death punch sound is our claim to fame"). The song has been used as entrance music by  pitchers Drew Storen, Jake Arrieta and Madison Bumgarner.

Track listing

Charts

Weekly charts

Year-end charts

Certifications

Band members
Zoltan Bathory – guitars
Jason Hook – guitars
Ivan Moody – vocals
Matt Snell – bass
Jeremy Spencer – drums

References

External links
 Lyrics of live cover by Queen + Paul Rodgers from Live in Ukraine, from Queen official website

1974 songs
2010 singles
Bad Company songs
Five Finger Death Punch songs
Songs written by Paul Rodgers
Song recordings produced by Kevin Churko
Island Records singles
Hard rock ballads
1970s ballads